Hill Ridge is a ridge in Androscoggin County, Maine, in the United States.

Hill Ridge was named after Nathaniel Hill, a pioneer who settled there.

References

Landforms of Androscoggin County, Maine
Ridges of Maine